Bairoletto, la aventura de un rebelde is a 1985 Argentine historical drama about Juan Bautista Bairoletto directed and written by Atilio Polverini and Sebastián Larreta.

Cast
Arturo Bonín ...  Bairoletto
Luisina Brando

Rudy Chernicoff
María Vaner

Ernesto Michel
Jorge Velurtas
Raúl Florido
Oscar Arrese
Sebastián Larreta
Esther Goris
Ricardo Alanis ...  Vallejos
Ana María Ambas
José Andrada
Inés Belgrano
Cristina Fernández
Ricardo Ibarlin
Ricardo Jordán
Alberto Lago
Claudio Martínez
Miguel Ángel Martínez
Jorge Martín
Miguel Ángel Porro
Carlos Roffé
Rolly Serrano ...  Soto

External links
 

1985 films
1980s Spanish-language films
1980s historical films
Argentine films based on actual events
Argentine historical films
1980s Argentine films